Valle Parish is an administrative unit of Bauska Municipality in the Semigallia region of Latvia. Prior to 2009, it was part of Aizkraukle District, Latvia.

Towns, villages and settlements of Valle Parish 
Krīči
Liepkalni
Mazvalle
Mežmuiža
Penderi
Pētermuiža
Reizeni
Salas
Taurkalne
Tenteni
Valle

Parishes of Latvia
Bauska Municipality
Semigallia